Melaenosia is a genus of spiders in the family Mimetidae. It was first described in 1906 by Simon. , it contains only one Indian species, Melaenosia pustulifera.

References

Mimetidae
Monotypic Araneomorphae genera
Spiders of the Indian subcontinent